Jae-hyuk is a Korean masculine given name. Its meaning differs based on the hanja used to write each syllable of the name. There are 20 hanja with the reading "jae" and nine hanja with the reading "hyuk" on the South Korean government's official list of hanja which may be registered for use in given names.

People with this name include:
Park Jae-hyuk (born 1963), South Korean alpine skier
Lee Jae-hyuk (born 1969), South Korean retired amateur boxer
James Kyson, Korean name Lee Jae-hyuk (born 1975), South Korean-born American actor
Sa Jae-hyouk (born 1985), South Korean weightlifter
Jaehyuck Choi (born 1994), South Korean-born American composer
Im Jae-hyuk (born 1994), South Korean actor
Lim Jae-hyeok (born 1999), South Korean football forward

Fictional characters with this name include:
Kang Jae-hyuk, in 2007 South Korean film The Perfect Couple
Yu Jae-hyuk, in 2009 South Korean film Five Senses of Eros
Jae-hyuk, in 2012 South Korean film Deranged 
Choi Jae-hyuk, in 2012 South Korean television series Tasty Life 
Jung Jae-hyuk, in 2012 South Korean television series Fashion King 
Lee Jae-hyeok, in 2012 South Korean film Wonderful Radio 
Seo Jae-hyuk, in 2014 South Korean drama Remember

See also
List of Korean given names

References

Korean masculine given names